The following is a list of Finnish Americans, including both original immigrants who obtained American citizenship and their American descendants.

To be included in this list, the person must have a Wikipedia article showing they are Finnish American or must have references showing they are Finnish American and are notable.

List

Academics, inventors, scientists
 Lars Ahlfors (1907–1996), mathematician, one of the first two people to be awarded the Fields Medal; Wolf Prize winner; William Caspar Graustein Professor of Mathematics at Harvard University
 Alfred Aho (born 1941), computer scientist best known for his work on programming languages, compilers, and related algorithms, and his textbooks on the art and science of computer programming, as of 2011 he holds the Lawrence Gussman Chair of Computer Science at Columbia University. He served as chair of the department from 1995 to 1997, and again in the spring of 2003
 Jaakko Hintikka (1929–2015), professor of philosophy at Boston University; regarded as the founder of formal epistemic logic and of game semantics for logic
 Bengt Robert Holmström (born 1949), economist, Nobel Laureate with Oliver Hart "for their contribution to contract theory", professor of economics; currently Paul A. Samuelson Professor of Economics at the Massachusetts Institute of Technology
 Ruth Kaarlela (1919–2018), professor of blindness and vision studies, Western Michigan University; expert on rehabilitation, gerontology
 Benjamin B. Rubinstein (1905–1989), physician and psychoanalyst; had a practice in New York; wrote extensively on philosophy of psychoanalysis
 Linus Torvalds (born 1969), software engineer best known for having initiated the development of the Linux kernel; became a U.S. citizen in September 2010
 Vaino Jack Vehko (1918–1999), automotive engineer; NASA rocket scientist; in 1960 became Director of Engineering on the Saturn S1 and S1B booster rocket program at Chrysler Space Division's Michoud operation in New Orleans, Louisiana; the Saturn boosters successfully launched all the NASA Apollo and moon missions
 Carl A. Wirtanen (1910–1990), astronomer

Arts and literature
 Jean M. Auel (born 1936), author, wrote the Earth's Children books; her books have sold 34 million copies worldwide in many translations
 Rudy Autio (1926–2007), sculptor
 Max Dimont (1912–1992), historian; author of Jews, God and History, which received critical acclaim and has sold over a million and a half copies; has lectured on Jewish history throughout the United States, Canada, South Africa, Brazil, and Finland; author of The Indestructible Jews, The Jews in America, and Appointment in Jerusalem
 Eino Friberg (1901–1995), Protestant Minister and English translator of The Kalevala, the Finnish national epic
 Rick Hautala (1949–2013), writer
 Clifton Karhu (1927-2007), artist in Japan renounced for woodblock prints of Kyoto and Kanazawa
 Tiina Nunnally, author and translator
 Emil Petaja, author
 Hannu Rajaniemi, science fiction author
 Eero Saarinen (1910–1961), architect and product designer of the 20th century, famous for his simple, sweeping, arching structural curves
 Eliel Saarinen (1873–1950), architect who became famous for his art nouveau buildings in the early 20th century
 Haddon Sundblom, artist
 Wallace Wood, comics artist (EC Comics, Mad Magazine, Marvel Comics)

Business
 Bill Aho (born 1957), businessman who is a partner with The SagePoint Group, a management consulting firm, served as Senior Vice President of Strategic Planning for Darden Restaurants and was instrumental in turning around the Red Lobster business.
 Mary Barra, CEO of General Motors
 Mike Markkula (born 1942), entrepreneur; angel investor and second CEO of Apple Computer, Inc.; provided early critical funding and managerial support; known as Apple employee #3
  Marissa Mayer, CEO of Yahoo and former Google executive
 Gustave Niebaum (1842–1908), established Inglenook Winery in Napa Valley, California, the first Bordeaux style winery in the US
 Oscar Wirkkala (1880–1959), logger and inventor, developed the high lead method of logging, which revolutionized the industry; also invented important pieces of that industry's machinery used during the first half of the 20th century

Film and television
 Pamela Anderson, actress, father is of part Finnish ancestry
 Richard Dean Anderson, paternal grandfather came from Finland
 Maude Apatow (born 1997), actress
 Lucas Bryant, actor
 Austin Butler, actor, Finnish on maternal side
 David Chokachi (born 1968), actor, mother is of Finnish descent

 Matt Damon (born 1970), award-winning screenwriter and actor, mother is of partial Finnish descent
 Eric Dane (born 1972), actor
 Alexa Davalos (born 1982), actress, mother is of partial Finnish descent
 Elyssa Davalos (born 1959), actress, father was of partial Finnish descent
 Richard Davalos (1930–2016), actor; starred in East of Eden (1955) as James Dean's brother; portrayed the convict Blind Dick in Cool Hand Luke (1967); won the Theatre World Award for his performance in the Arthur Miller play A Memory of Two Mondays in 1955; fa is of Finnish descent
 Anna Easteden (born 1976), actress; The House of Branching Love (2009) and Sideways (2009); co-starred in soap operas Passions and Days Of Our Lives, and the series Bones
 Taina Elg (born 1931), Golden Globe-winning film and stage actress
 Nathan Fillion (born 1970), actor
 George Gaynes (1917–2016), film actor, known for his role as Commandant Eric Lassard in the Police Academy film series
 Renny Harlin (born 1959), producer and director; immigrant from Finland
 Crystal Hayes (born 1984), model and actress
 Brian Heidik (born 1968), won $1,000,000 on the Thailand edition of Survivor
 Nancy Juvonen (born 1967), American-Finnish film producer; with Drew Barrymore, co-owner of production company Flower Films; produced Never been Kissed (1999), Charlie's Angels (2000), Donnie Darko (2002), Charlie's Angels – Full Throttle (2003); wife of comedian and talk show host Jimmy Fallon
 Paul Kangas, host of Nightly Business Report television program
 Vincent Kartheiser (born 1979), actor, known for his role in Mad Men, has distant Finnish ancestry
 Marta Kristen (born 1945), perhaps best known for her role as the character "Judy Robinson" in the cult television series Lost in Space
 Christine Lahti (born 1950), film actress, paternal grandparents were immigrants from Finland
 Jessica Lange (born 1949), two-time Academy Award-winning film actress, maternal grandparents were of Finnish descent
 Dick Latvala (1943–1999), tape archivist for the Grateful Dead
 Scott Lautanen, television director and producer
 David Lynch (born 1946), director, mother is of part Finnish ancestry
 Leslie Mann (born 1972), actress who has appeared in numerous films, including The Cable Guy (1996), George of the Jungle (1997), Big Daddy (1999), The 40-Year-Old Virgin (2005), Knocked Up (2007), 17 Again (2009), Funny People (2009), This Is 40 (2012), and Blockers (2018)
 Lisa Niemi (born 1956), actress, director and choreographer
 Marian Nixon (1904–1983), actress
 Maila Nurmi (1921–2008), creator of the well-remembered 1950s character of Vampira
 Catherine Oxenberg (born 1961), actress
 Ethan Peck (born 1986), actor
 Bonnie Pietila, casting director and producer for The Simpsons
 Joyce Randolph (born Joyce Sirola, 1924), actress, best known for playing Trixie Norton on The Honeymooners
 Allison Rosati (born 1963), journalist, paternal Finnish ancestry
 Eric Saarinen (born 1942), cinematographer, son of Eero Saarinen
 Albert Salmi (1928–1990), film and television actor
 Steve Schubert (born 1951), football player, paternal grandmother was a Finnish immigrant
 Vanessa Williams (born 1963), singer, actress, producer, former fashion model; first African American to be crowned Miss America; a DNA test revealed she is 12% Finnish
 Marsha Garces Williams, film producer and mom of Zelda Williams
 Zelda Williams (born 1989), actress, daughter of Robin Williams; mother of partial Finnish descent
 Renée Zellweger (born 1969), actress and producer; mother of partial Finnish descent
 Daphne Zuniga, Actress,mother of partial finnish deecent.

Military personnel
 Johannes Anderson (1887–1950), Finnish-born U.S. Army soldier during World War I; Medal of Honor recipient
 Reino Hayhanen (1920–1961), U.S. spy; Soviet Lt. Colonel who defected to the U.S. during the Cold War; helped break open the Hollow Nickel Case which led to the capture of top Soviet spies in the U.S. looking for atomic secrets 
 Timothy L. Kopra (born 1963), astronaut; flew missions on the International Space Station and Space Shuttle Discovery; U.S. Army Colonel; Desert Storm veteran; Bronze Star recipient; West Point graduate
 Lauri Törni (1919–1965), Finnish Army Captain who led an infantry company in Finnish Winter and Continuation Wars; moved to the United States after World War II and adopted the name Larry Thorne; served with the U.S. Army Special Forces in Vietnam War; killed in Laos while on a clandestine mission
 Dale Eugene Wayrynen (1947–1967), U.S. Army enlisted soldier; recipient of the Medal of Honor, America's highest military decoration, for his actions in the Vietnam War
 Carl E. Vuono (born 1934), retired United States Army general who served as the Chief of Staff of the United States Army from 1987 to 1991.

Musicians
 Sylvester Ahola, jazz musician
 Muriel Anderson (born 1960), guitarist and harp-guitarist
 Carla Harvey (born 1976), singer
 Jillian Hervey (born 1989), singer and dancer
 Mark Hoppus (born 1972), bass player in Blink-182
 Jorma Kaukonen (born 1940), blues, folk and rock guitarist
 Peter Kaukonen (born 1945), blues, folk and rock guitarist; younger brother of Jorma Kaukonen
 David Mustaine (born 1961), musician best known as the co-founder, vocalist, lead guitarist, and primary songwriter of American heavy metal band Megadeth
 Jaco Pastorius (1951–1987), influential jazz bassist
 Wilho Saari, Kantele musician
 Hiski Salomaa (1891–1957), folk singer and songwriter
 Esa-Pekka Salonen (born 1958), orchestral conductor and composer; Principal Conductor and artistic director of the Los Angeles Philharmonic
 T-Bone Slim (1890?–1942?), humourist, poet, songwriter, hobo, and a labour activist in the Industrial Workers of the World
 Einar Aaron Swan, jazz musician
 David Uosikkinen (born 1956), rock drummer
 Osmo Vänskä (born 1953), orchestral conductor, clarinetist and composer; music director of the Minnesota Orchestra
 Bobby Vee (1943–2016), rock singer, 1960s teen idol, Finnish on his mother's side (Tapanila)
 Charles Wuorinen (1938–2020), Pulitzer Prize-winning composer

Dance
 Shura Baryshnikov (born 1981), dancer and choreographer
 Carolyn Carlson (born 1943), choreographer and performer

Politics
 Gregory Nevala Calvert (1937–2005), National Secretary of Students for a Democratic Society, 1966–67
 Gus Hall (1910–2000), labor organizer, a founder of the United Steelworkers of America trade union; a leader of the Communist Party USA; five-time U.S. presidential candidate
 Cheri Honkala (born 1963), the Green Party's nominee for vice-president in the 2012 U.S. presidential election
 Emil Hurja (1892–1953), pioneer of political opinion polling; a top advisor to President Franklin D. Roosevelt; appeared on the cover of Time magazine in March 1936
 Oscar Larson (1871–1957), U.S. Representative from Minnesota, Republican, lawyer
 Marko Liias (born 1981), Washington State Democratic Senator representing the 21st legislative district. Former member of the Washington House of Representatives, 2020 candidate for Lieutenant Governor
 Robert W. Mattson, Jr. (1948–2012), Minnesota State Auditor, 1975–1979; Minnesota State Treasurer, 1983–1987
 Robert W. Mattson, Sr. (1924–1982), Minnesota State Attorney General, 1964–1967
 John Morton (1724–1777), signer of the Declaration of Independence; delegate who cast the deciding vote in favor of Pennsylvania's support for United States Declaration of Independence
 William A. Niskanen, chairman of the Cato Institute
 William Alex Stolt (1900–2001), mayor of Anchorage, Alaska, 1941–1944
 Oskari Tokoi (1873–1963), Finnish politician
 John Raymond Ylitalo (1916–1987), U.S. Ambassador to Paraguay; career U.S. Foreign Service Officer

Sports
 Lars Anderson, wrestler
 Michael Anti, sport shooter
 Randy Carlyle, ice hockey player, coach
 Dick Enberg (1935–2017), former sportscaster for the San Diego Padres, CBS, and ESPN
 Link Gaetz, ice hockey player
  Drew Gooden, NBA player; Finnish mother
 Dwight Helminen, ice hockey player
 Lars Helminen, ice hockey player
 Shawn Huff, basketball player for the Finnish national team; Finnish mother
 Tristan Jeskanen, luger
 Kai Kantola, ice hockey player
 Teemu Kivihalme, ice hockey player
 William Kolehmainen (1887–1967), long-distance runner
 Jeff Lahti, Major League Baseball pitcher
 Gerald Lee, basketball player for the Finnish national team; Finnish mother
 Kristi Leskinen, freestyle skier
 Chico Maki, ice hockey player
 Wayne Maki, ice hockey player
 John Michaelson, only Major League Baseball player born in Finland
 Alex Murphy, NCAA basketball player and brother of Erik Murphy; Finnish mother
 Erik Murphy, basketball player for the Finnish national team; Finnish mother
 Matt Niskanen, ice hockey player
 Dan O'Brien (born 1966), former American decathlete, deemed one of the best decathlon athletes of the 1990s, winning an Olympic gold medal in Atlanta in 1996 after winning three consecutive world titles
 Will Ohman, Major League Baseball pitcher
 Blake Pietila, ice hockey player
 Luke Putkonen, Major League Baseball pitcher
 Pete Rasmus (1906–1975), discus thrower
 Rudy Rintala (1909-1999), four-sport collegiate athlete and hall-of-famer at Stanford University
 Brian Salonen, football player
 Kevin Tapani, Major League Baseball pitcher who played for the New York Mets, Minnesota Twins, Los Angeles Dodgers, Chicago White Sox, and Chicago Cubs, 1989–2001
 Nick Theslof, soccer player and coach; first American player to play in Europe

Other
 Carrie Keranen, voice actress, production manager, producer and voice director 
 Armi Kuusela, winner of the first Miss Universe beauty contest
 Miriam Patchen, peace activist
 Aileen Wuornos, serial killer, mother is of Finnish descent

References

Finnish Americans
 
Lists of Finnish people
Finnish